Gene Adam is an American musician and the original singer of heavy metal band Iced Earth/Purgatory.

Career 
Adam joined Purgatory in 1985 and performed many shows with them, as well as recording several demo tapes. In 1988, the band changed their name to Iced Earth and added Randall Shawver as a second guitarist. Adam wrote the lyrics to "Written on the Walls", the only Iced Earth song he is noted as co-writing. The band began working on demos in 1988 and released their first official demo tape Enter the Realm in 1989, followed by the self-titled Iced Earth album in 1990. Adam continued to perform shows with the band, notably touring Germany in early 1991 as support for Blind Guardian.

The more progressive sound of Iced Earth and the epic themes of the forthcoming Night of the Stormrider album made Adams' thrash-inspired vocals seem out of place, and he was removed from the band. Before leaving, Adam performed the songs "Stormrider", "Mystical End" and "Winter Nights" live with the band. Although Adam did not get to record studio versions of the songs, the first two were recorded in studio with Jon Schaffer and Adam's successor John Greely respectively, and the latter with Matt Barlow. Schaffer was then introduced to John Greely through their mutual friend Tom Morris, and after one short practice he was hired to replace Adam. Adam left because Schaffer would not allow him to contribute lyrics (aside from "Written on the Walls").

In 2002, Adam became the singer of Unearthed, a band formed of ex-Iced Earth members including bassist Dave Abell and former Purgatory guitarist Bill Owen. At this time, Adam had been retired from music for several years.

Albums 
Purgatory
1985: Burning Oasis (demo)
1986: Psychotic Dreams (demo)
1986: Horror Show (demo)

Iced Earth
1989: Enter the Realm (demo)
1990: Iced Earth
2004: The Blessed and The Damned (compilation)

Unearthed
2004: Unearthed (demo)

Jon Schaffer's Purgatory
2018: Purgatory (EP (as Purgatory))

Of Ice
2022: Wake Up (single)

References

Iced Earth members
Year of birth missing (living people)
Living people